The Nagoya Protocol on Access to Genetic Resources and the Fair and Equitable Sharing of Benefits Arising from their Utilization to the Convention on Biological Diversity, also known as the Nagoya Protocol on Access and Benefit Sharing (ABS) is a 2010 supplementary agreement to the 1992 Convention on Biological Diversity (CBD). Its aim is the implementation of one of the three objectives of the CBD: the fair and equitable sharing of benefits arising out of the utilization of genetic resources, thereby contributing to the conservation and sustainable use of biodiversity. It sets out obligations for its contracting parties to take measures in relation to access to genetic resources, benefit-sharing and compliance.

The protocol was adopted on 29 October 2010 in Nagoya, Japan, and entered into force on 12 October 2014.  it has been ratified by 137 parties, which includes 136 UN member states and the European Union.

Concerns have been expressed that the added bureaucracy and legislation could be damaging to the monitoring and collection of biodiversity, to conservation, to the international response to infectious diseases, and to research.

Aims and scope

The Nagoya Protocol applies to genetic resources that are covered by the CBD, and to the benefits arising from their utilization. The protocol also covers traditional knowledge associated with genetic resources that are covered by the CBD and the benefits arising from its utilization.

Its aim is the implementation of one of the three objectives of the CBD: the fair and equitable sharing of benefits arising out of the utilization of genetic resources, thereby contributing to the conservation and sustainable use of biodiversity.

Adoption and ratification
The protocol was adopted on 29 October 2010 in Nagoya, Japan, at the tenth meeting of the Conference of the Parties, held from 18 to 29 October 2010 and entered into force on 12 October 2014.

 it has been ratified by 137 parties, which includes 136 UN member states and the European Union.

Obligations
The Nagoya Protocol sets out obligations for its contracting parties to take measures in relation to access to genetic resources, benefit-sharing and compliance.

Access obligations
Domestic-level access measures aim to:
Create legal certainty, clarity, and transparency
Provide fair and non-arbitrary rules and procedures
Establish clear rules and procedures for prior informed consent and mutually agreed on terms
Provide for issuance of a permit or equivalent when access is granted
Create conditions to promote and encourage research contributing to biodiversity conservation and sustainable use
Pay due regard to cases of present or imminent emergencies that threaten human, animal, or plant health
Consider the importance of genetic resources for food and agriculture for food security

Benefit-sharing obligations
Domestic-level benefit-sharing measures aim to provide for the fair and equitable sharing of benefits arising from the utilization of genetic resources with the contracting party providing genetic resources. Utilization includes research and development on the genetic or biochemical composition of genetic resources, as well as subsequent applications and commercialization. Sharing is subject to mutually agreed terms. Benefits may be monetary or non-monetary such as royalties and the sharing of research results.

Compliance obligations
Specific obligations to support compliance with the domestic legislation or regulatory requirements of the contracting party providing genetic resources, and contractual obligations reflected in mutually agreed terms, are a significant innovation of the Nagoya Protocol.

Contracting parties are to:
Take measures providing that genetic resources utilized within their jurisdiction have been accessed in accordance with prior informed consent, and that mutually agreed terms have been established, as required by another contracting party
Cooperate in cases of an alleged violation of another contracting party's requirements
Encourage contractual provisions on dispute resolution in mutually agreed terms
Ensure an opportunity is available to seek recourse under their legal systems when disputes arise from mutually agreed terms (MAT)
Take measures regarding access to justice
Monitor the use of genetic resources after they leave a country by designating effective checkpoints at every stage of the value chain: research, development, innovation, pre-commercialization, or commercialization

Implementation
The Nagoya Protocol's success will require effective implementation at the domestic level. A range of tools and mechanisms provided by the Nagoya Protocol will assist contracting parties including:
Establishing national focal points (NFPs) and competent national authorities (CNAs) to serve as contact points for information, grant access, or cooperate on issues of compliance
An Access and Benefit-sharing Clearing-House to share information, such as domestic regulatory ABS requirements or information on NFPs and CNAs
Capacity-building to support key aspects of implementation.

Based on a country's self-assessment of national needs and priorities, capacity-building may help to:
Develop domestic ABS legislation to implement the Nagoya Protocol
Negotiate mutually-agreed terms
Develop in-country research capability and institutions
Raise awareness
Transfer technology
Target financial support for capacity-building and development initiatives through the GEF

Relationship to other international agreements
A growing number of Preferential Trade Agreements (PTAs) include provisions related to access to genetic resources or to the sharing of the benefits that arise out of their utilization. Indeed, some recent trade agreements, originating notably from Latin American countries, provide specific measures designed to facilitate the implementation of the ABS provisions contained in the Nagoya Protocol, including measures related to technical assistance, transparency and dispute settlement.

Criticism
However, there are concerns that the added bureaucracy and legislation will, overall, be damaging to the monitoring and collection of biodiversity, to conservation, to the international response to infectious diseases, and to research.

Many scientists have voiced concern over the protocol, fearing the increased red tape will hamper disease prevention and conservation efforts, and that the threat of possible imprisonment of scientists will have a chilling effect on research. Non-commercial biodiversity researchers and institutions such as natural history museums fear maintaining biological reference collections and exchanging material between institutions will become difficult.

See also
 Animal Genetic Resources for Food and Agriculture
 Bermuda Principles
Cartagena Protocol on Biosafety, another supplementary protocol adopted by the CBD

References

Further reading

External links
 (CBD website)

2010 in Japan
History of Nagoya
Treaties concluded in 2010
Treaties entered into force in 2014
Treaties of Afghanistan
Treaties of Albania
Treaties of Antigua and Barbuda
Treaties of Argentina
Treaties of Belarus
Treaties of Belgium
Treaties of Benin
Treaties of Bhutan
Treaties of Bolivia
Treaties of Botswana
Treaties of Bulgaria
Treaties of Burkina Faso
Treaties of Myanmar
Treaties of Burundi
Treaties of Cambodia
Treaties of Cameroon
Treaties of the Central African Republic
Treaties of the People's Republic of China
Treaties of the Comoros
Treaties of the Democratic Republic of the Congo
Treaties of the Republic of the Congo
Treaties of Croatia
Treaties of Cuba
Treaties of the Czech Republic
Treaties of Denmark
Treaties of Djibouti
Treaties of the Dominican Republic
Treaties of Egypt
Treaties of Ethiopia
Treaties of Fiji
Treaties of Finland
Treaties of France
Treaties of Gabon
Treaties of the Gambia
Treaties of Germany
Treaties of Guatemala
Treaties of Guinea
Treaties of Guinea-Bissau
Treaties of Guyana
Treaties of Honduras
Treaties of Hungary
Treaties of Indonesia
Treaties of India
Treaties of Ivory Coast
Treaties of Jordan
Treaties of Kazakhstan
Treaties of Kenya
Treaties of Kyrgyzstan
Treaties of Laos
Treaties of Lesotho
Treaties of Liberia
Treaties of Luxembourg
Treaties of Madagascar
Treaties of Malawi
Treaties of Malaysia
Treaties of Mali
Treaties of the Marshall Islands
Treaties of Mexico
Treaties of Moldova
Treaties of Mongolia
Treaties of Malta
Treaties of Mauritania
Treaties of Mauritius
Treaties of the Federated States of Micronesia
Treaties of Mozambique
Treaties of Namibia
Treaties of the Netherlands
Treaties of Niger
Treaties of Norway
Treaties of Pakistan
Treaties of Palau
Treaties of Panama
Treaties of Peru
Treaties of the Philippines
Treaties of Rwanda
Treaties of Saint Kitts and Nevis
Treaties of Samoa
Treaties of Senegal
Treaties of Serbia
Treaties of Seychelles
Treaties of Sierra Leone
Treaties of Slovakia
Treaties of South Africa
Treaties of Spain
Treaties of Sudan
Treaties of Sweden
Treaties of Eswatini
Treaties of Switzerland
Treaties of Syria
Treaties of Tajikistan
Treaties of Tanzania
Treaties of Togo
Treaties of Tuvalu
Treaties of the United Arab Emirates
Treaties of the United Kingdom
Treaties of Uruguay
Treaties of Venezuela
Treaties of Vietnam
Treaties of Zambia
Treaties entered into by the European Union
Biodiversity
Environmental treaties
United Nations treaties
Genetics
Convention on Biological Diversity